Glo is a Canadian alternative rock band from Montreal, Quebec formed in 2001. They consist of Riccardo "Rick" Cordi (vocals, guitars), Eddie Mazzola (guitar, bass, keyboards), and Patrick Rowan (drums).

Their self-titled debut received favorable reviews and spawned the single ‘Wither’ which appeared on the soundtrack for the TV series Higher Ground. Soon after the release of Glo, they were invited to perform at NXNE in Toronto, Ontario, Canada and the ‘In the City’ music festival in Manchester, England.

After taking a brief hiatus, Glo released their highly anticipated follow-up ‘Off to the Races Vol. 1’, in early 2007. Soon after its release, the material began getting regular airplay in stations across Canada. With a growing fan base, Glo began work on a new full-length studio album. On the Outside was released in 2010 through the GloMusicGroup. While the album was completed in 2009, the band was dissatisfied with the production and decided to turn to veteran produced Paul Lani (U2, Red Hot Chili Peppers, and Megadeth) for the final mix. The album was officially launched in 2010, and the first single from the new disc, "Move Along", stayed on the Canadian Active Rock charts for 12 weeks, peaking at number 41.

The band returned to the studio in 2012 and collaborated with producer John Nathaniel. The result was a new EP called "No One Hears Me"" that was well-received The band toured across Canada and released two videos - Don't Believe and Come Around - in support of the album.

The EP resulted in their second nomination for "Best Out of Province Artist" at the 2012 Toronto Independent Music Awards.

"Off to the Races Vol. 1" was named Best Provincial Rock EP and the single "Off to the Races" was named Best Provincial Rock Song in the 2007 Toronto Exclusive Magazine Awards.

Nominated as the Best out of Province Rock Band at the 2007 Toronto Independent Music Awards.

The songs "Dopamine" and "Drown in Me" were featured on the soundtrack to the motion picture The Power of Attorney.

References

External links
Glo official website
On the Outside album review

Musical groups established in 2001
Musical groups from Montreal
Canadian alternative rock groups